The discography of the English indie rock band Kasabian consists of seven studio albums, two live albums, six extended plays, 22 singles and 28 music videos. The six studio albums include, Kasabian (2004), Empire (2006), West Ryder Pauper Lunatic Asylum (2009), Velociraptor! (2011), 48:13 (2014), and For Crying Out Loud (2017).

Five of their studio albums have reached number one on the UK Albums Chart.

Albums

Studio albums

Live albums

Compilation albums

Extended plays

Singles

Notes

Other charted songs

Notes

Soundtrack appearances

Music videos

References

External links

Kasabian official site
Kasabian's Paradise

Discography
Discographies of British artists
Rock music group discographies